RFA Orangeleaf was a Leaf-class fleet support tanker of the Royal Fleet Auxiliary.

As MV Balder London, before joining the RFA, she saw action in 1982, carrying aviation fuel to the Falkland Islands from Ascension. At the end of the conflict, she entered San Carlos water.

Orangeleaf saw action in the Gulf War in 1991. During early-to-mid-2004, the ship took part in a deployment with a French carrier battle group, centred on the aircraft carrier Charles de Gaulle, to the Indian Ocean. She also appeared in the International Fleet Review of 2005.

On 23 October 2009, she was moved from Birkenhead dry-docks into the River Mersey and so to the Cammell Laird shipyard to continue a major refit.

She was decommissioned on 30 September 2015.

In late February 2016 she was towed to Aliaga, Turkey to be broken up for scrap. Leyal reported scrapping was completed by June 2016.

References

External links

Official Webpage

Ships of the Royal Fleet Auxiliary
Leaf-class tankers
1975 ships
Ships built on the River Mersey
Gulf War ships of the United Kingdom